"Kissed It" is a song by the American soul singer Macy Gray. It is the second US single from her fifth album The Sellout. The song was released digitally on May 24, 2010 in the United States and features the musicians of Velvet Revolver and Guns N' Roses, Slash, Duff McKagan and Matt Sorum. In September 2010, the song peaked on the Italian Airplay Chart at number 62.

Promotion
Gray performed the song on Later... with Jools Holland on May 26 and on Late Night with Jimmy Fallon on June 24.

Track listing
"Kissed It" – 4:36

Personnel
Macy Gray – vocals
Slash – guitar
Duff McKagan – bass
Matt Sorum – drums, percussion

Note: Slash, McKagan, and Sorum credited as Velvet Revolver.

References

Songs about kissing
2010 songs
2010 singles
Macy Gray songs
Songs written by Macy Gray
Island Records singles
American pop rock songs